Aaron Darnell Ford (born May 24, 1972) is an American lawyer and politician serving as the 34th Attorney General of Nevada, since 2019. A  member of the Democratic Party, he previously served as a Nevada State Senator for the 11th district from 2013 to 2018, which encompasses parts of the Las Vegas Valley including portions of the communities of Spring Valley and Enterprise.

Early life and education
Ford was born and raised in Dallas, Texas. He is the oldest of three sons from a working-class African-American family. Ford earned a scholarship and received his undergraduate degree from Texas A&M University in 1994. He was the first in his family to graduate from college. He earned a master's degree from George Washington University. He studied international education at George Washington University while teaching at a local high school. He also has  Master of Arts, Juris Doctor, and Ph.D. degrees from Ohio State University.

In January 1991, Ford was arrested and charged with public intoxication on his college campus. He was arrested a second time as a result of a payment plan dispute concerning a borrowed tire. The case was immediately dismissed when he agreed to accelerate his payment to the tire shop owner. Ford was also arrested twice for failing to appear in court. These arrests became a campaign issue in the Nevada attorney general race in 2018 and again in Ford's re-election bid in 2022, although a fact check by the Reno Gazette-Journal in October 2022 noted that (contrary to claims made by his opponent, Republican nominee Sigal Chattah) Ford has never been convicted of a crime.

Political career
Ford ran for Nevada Senate from District 12 in 2010 and lost to Senator Joe Hardy by 19.23%.

Having moved to Nevada Senate District 11 in 2011, he ran for the District 11 seat in 2012, defeating John Drake by 24.6%.

Since November 5, 2014, Ford has been the Democratic Leader of the Nevada State Senate. He served as the Assistant Majority Whip during Nevada's 77th Legislative Session. He also served as Chair of Senate Committee on Natural Resources, Vice Chair Senate Committee on Education, and as a Member of Senate Judiciary Committee.

Subsequent to this first legislative session, Ford was named Freshman Senator of the Year by both the Las Vegas Review Journal and the Reno Gazette Journal. Ford was named Senator of the Year by Nevada Political Action for Animals and the Nevada Conservation League.

During the 2016 interim, Ford serves on the Legislative Commission, the Advisory Committee to Develop a Plan to Reorganize the Clark County School District, and the Legislative Commission's Subcommittee to Study Water. He also sits by designation on the Interim Finance Committee.

During the 2014 interim, Ford served as a Member of the Council to Establish Academic Standards; Technological Crime Advisory Board; Legislative Committee on Public Lands; Legislative Committee on Education; Legislative Commission on Energy; and the Advisory Council on Parental Involvement and Family Engagement.

During the 2017 Nevada Legislative session, Ford led the efforts requiring law enforcement agencies to turn over rape kits for testing within 30 days and require labs to test them within 120 days. The bill mandated the creation of a Nevada-wide sexual assault kit tracking program, which would allow victims to follow the status of their rape kits as they go through the criminal justice system.

He also co-sponsored the Nevada Pregnant Workers' Fairness Act to provide protections to female employees and applicants for employment from discriminatory or unlawful employment practices based on pregnancy, childbirth, or any related medical conditions.

Ford helped pass the nation's strongest pharmaceutical transparency legislation.  The law requires that if pharmaceutical manufacturers for diabetes medication have increased medication prices by a certain amount, they must disclose information regarding cost of making and marketing drugs, in addition to rebates they may provide. The law also works to create more transparency around PBMs, compelling them to act in insurers' best interests and bans PBMs from forbidding pharmacists from discussing lower-cost options with patients, something called a gag clause.

Ford passed a “fiduciary duty” bill which removed exemptions for broker-dealers and financial advisors from rules that applied to financial planners and held them accountable for meeting a fiduciary duty to their clients. Ford said he proposed the rule because of concerns that President Trump was “trying to do everything to stop” the implementation of the fiduciary rule.” UNLV law professor Benjamin Edwards said Senator Ford’s legislation would “return integrity to a dirty business” and “creates a level playing field for the firms that do things the right way.”

Ford was the Democratic nominee for Nevada Attorney General in 2018. He defeated Republican nominee Wes Duncan on November 6, 2018. He successfully ran for re-election in 2022, defeating Republican nominee Sighal Chattah. Ford won his race by nearly 8 percentage points and was the best-performing Democrat on the statewide ticket; he also was the only statewide Democrat to win Carson City, and the first Democrat since 2014 to win a county or county equivalent outside of Clark and Washoe counties.

Personal life
Growing up, Ford was a participant in Project Upward Bound, a government program that helps predominantly low-income and first-generation students to attend college. Ford believes he “would not be where [he] is today if not for Upward Bound” because of the additional educational support and mentorship it provided him. He ultimately received a scholarship to Texas A&M University, where he received a B.S. in Interdisciplinary Studies.

Ford’s first job out of college was as a public school math teacher in Austin, Texas, while his wife Berna Rhodes Ford finished her Juris Doctor degree and their son Avery began preschool. He continued to teach while earning his Master’s degree in international education from George Washington University. Ford then pursued and received a Master’s degree in educational administration, his Juris Doctor degree, and a PhD in educational administration from the Ohio State University. After completing his studies at Ohio State, Ford moved to Michigan where he clerked for Federal Judge Denise Page Hood. Shortly thereafter, he moved to Las Vegas for the first time to clerk for Judge Johnnie B. Rawlinson on the Ninth Circuit Court of Appeals.

After completing his clerkships, Ford moved back to Texas to work at Bracewell & Giuliani LLP as an associate representing public schools, universities, and other public entities, and then Weil Gotshal & Manges as an associate practicing complex commercial litigation. Upon moving back to Las Vegas, Aaron joined Snell & Wilmer’s litigation group and was promoted to partner a few years later. Since then, he has also worked at Eglet Prince where he focused on consumer protection.

Ford is married to Berna Rhodes, an attorney. He and his wife are raising 3 sons (Avery, Aaron II, and Alexander) and their nephew, Devin. Avery is currently a 3rd-year student at George Washington University School of Medicine and President of his class. Aaron II is getting his undergraduate degree at University of Nevada, Reno in International Business. Alexander is a senior in high school.

Ford is a member of the I Have a Dream Foundation, Junior Achievement of Southern Nevada, Olive Crest of Nevada, Las Vegas Urban Chamber of Commerce, Clark County Justice of the Peace Selection Committee, Clark County Democratic Party, and National Bar Association (Las Vegas Chapter). Ford is a member of Kappa Alpha Psi fraternity. He is also a member of Sigma Pi Phi fraternity.

On July 21, 2018, the Las Vegas Review Journal reported that Aaron Ford "has a history of failing to fully pay his taxes." The IRS filed three tax liens against Ford for what amounted to more than $185,000 in unpaid taxes, interest and penalties from 2010, 2011, 2012 and 2013, according to Clark County records. Those liens were cleared in 2016. Ford's campaign manager, Peggy Yang, told the Las Vegas Review Journal that Ford had "faced some financial difficulties" as a result of the recession and that those "difficulties" were further complicated upon being promoted to partner at his law firm. Ford said that during the recession, his family had to take a pay cut, one of his sons started college and another son was hospitalized, explaining that they paid taxes every year but he was unable to pay the full amount due.

On July 30, 2018, the Washington Free Beacon reported that Ford purchased a new home for $468,138 in 2013, in the same year that he neglected to fully pay his income taxes. Ford explained that he also "short-sold a house during that time period, trying to find the best way to handle the financial stresses and strains that the Ford family encountered and endured during the recession as many other Nevadans had to do."

References

External links

 Government website
 Campaign website

|-

|-

1972 births
21st-century American politicians
African-American state legislators in Nevada
George Washington University Graduate School of Education and Human Development alumni
Living people
Nevada Attorneys General
Democratic Party Nevada state senators
Ohio State University Moritz College of Law alumni
People from Dallas
Politicians from Carson City, Nevada
Politicians from Las Vegas
Texas A&M University alumni